Alfonso Lista, formerly known as Potia, officially the Municipality of Lista  is a 3rd class municipality in the province of Ifugao, Philippines. According to the 2020 census, it has a population of 34,061 people.

History
Potia was created as the municipal district by virtue of Republic Act (RA) No. 1222 on May 11, 1955, from the barrios of Potia, Dolowog, San Juan, San Quintin, Cabicalan, Pinto, Busilac, Santa Maria, and Namillangan in the municipal district of Mayoyao; the seat of government then was designated at Barrio Potia.

Originally called Mun-uupag ("bubbles of foam") by the early Ifugao natives, Potia was derived from the term Putiak, a phenomenon wherein plants and flowers in the area opened their pods as they dried and cracked open. The Osmeña Commonwealth administration annexed the area presently compose Lista to the present-day San Mateo, Isabela. However, due to opposition by local settlers in the area, major part of the area was later transferred to Mayoyao of then Ifugao sub-province of the old Mountain Province.

On June 18, 1966, the day the old Mountain Province was divided into four political entities, one of which is Ifugao, by virtue of RA No. 4763, Barrio Kiling was transferred from the adjacent Paracales (present-day Paracelis, Mountain Province) to Potia, thus finishing the efforts to recover the "lost" territories of the municipality.

In 1959, the name of Potia was proposed to rename Lista in honor of its first mayor (1955–1959), Alfonso Lista. It was formalized on December 15, 1988 through RA No. 6687; Barangay Sta. Maria was confirmed as the seat of the municipal government.

However, several government documents including the Philippine Statistics Authority, Commission on Audit, and the municipality itself used the style "Alfonso Lista" as its name.

To avoid confusion with the name used on RA No. 6687, on May 24, 2021, House Bill No. 9451, introduced by Rep. Solomon Chungalao of the Ifugao Lone District, was filed and approved.

On June 2, 2022, RA No. 11813, the act renaming Lista as Alfonso Lista, was lapsed into law. A plebiscite, having no final schedule yet, will be supervised by the Commission on Elections.

Geography

Barangays
Alfonso Lista is politically subdivided into 20 barangays. These barangays are headed by elected officials: Barangay Captain, Barangay Council, whose members are called Barangay Councilors. All are elected every three years.

Climate

Demographics

The indigenes are largely Ifugao, with smaller numbers of Bontoc and Gaddang originating in the surrounding areas. The majority of the population, however, are Ilokano who began farming the area in the 1930s.

Economy

Government
Alfonso Lista, belonging to the lone congressional district of the province of Ifugao, is governed by a mayor designated as its local chief executive and by a municipal council as its legislative body in accordance with the Local Government Code. The mayor, vice mayor, and the councilors are elected directly by the people through an election which is being held every three years.

Elected officials

See also
List of renamed cities and municipalities in the Philippines

References

External links

 [ Philippine Standard Geographic Code]
Philippine Census Information
Local Governance Performance Management System 

Municipalities of Ifugao